Techaluta de Montenegro is a town and municipality, in Jalisco in central-western Mexico. The municipality covers an area of  152 km².

As of 2005, the municipality had a total population of 3,190.

References

Municipalities of Jalisco